Just Plain Charley is the seventh studio album by American country music artist Charley Pride. It was released in 1970 on the RCA Victor label (catalog no. LSP-4290). It included the No. 1 hit "(I'm So) Afraid of Losing You Again".

The album was awarded three stars from the web site AllMusic. It debuted on Billboard magazine's country album chart on February 21, 1970, peaked at No. 1, and remained on the chart for 42 weeks.

Track listing

Charts

Weekly charts

Year-end charts

See also
 Charley Pride discography

References

1970 albums
Charley Pride albums
albums produced by Jack Clement
albums produced by Felton Jarvis
RCA Records albums